The  is a river in eastern Honshu, Japan. It flows through the prefectures of Tochigi and Ibaraki and empties to the Pacific Ocean. More than 50 species of fish live in the river, including dace, chum salmon, ayu, and herring. The Japanese government categorizes it as a Class 1 river. Its source is at Nasu-dake in Nikkō National Park.

Naming

References 
 Spring Comes with the Arrival of Dace - Naka River, NHK 1998

External links

 (mouth)

Rivers of Tochigi Prefecture
Rivers of Ibaraki Prefecture
Rivers of Fukushima Prefecture
Rivers of Japan